The Hawaii Republican Party is the affiliate of the Republican Party (GOP) in Hawaii, headquartered in Honolulu. The party was initially strong during Hawaii's territorial days, but following statehood the Democratic Party took control. The party currently has very weak electoral power in the state and is one of the weakest affiliates of the national Republican Party. It currently controls none of Hawaii's statewide or federal elected offices.

History

Republic

Following the overthrow of the Hawaiian Kingdom and the creation of the Republic of Hawaii the American Union Party was created and as the Republic of Hawaii was a one-party state, it faced no opposition from opposing parties. On October 13, 1894, the American Union Party held its first convention to establish the party's organization, create a platform, and nominate candidates for the 1894 elections. Although the party's official stance was in favor of annexation by the United States due to it being the only legal party there were anti-annexation factions within the party.

Territorial

After Hawaii was annexed by the United States on July 12, 1898, the majority of the American Union Party's members created the Hawaii Republican Party. On March 10, 1899, members of the American Union Party and former leaders of the Republic held a meeting where they decided to postpone both the organization of a Republican Party and the creation of an auxiliary party organization. Later, on May 2, 1900, around one hundred men organized the Republican Party affiliate in Hawaii and the first Hawaii Republican Convention was held on May 30, 1900. Temporary officers were selected, a platform was created, and delegates were chosen to send to the Republican National Convention in June.

Although there was a Democratic affiliate in the territory at the time, it held little influence, while the Home Rule Party emerged as the main opposition to the Hawaii Republican Party. In 1900, the Home Rule Party took control of the territorial legislature and its leader, Robert William Wilcox, was elected as Hawaii's non-voting delegate to the federal House of Representatives. Prior to the 1902 election, the Reform Party merged into the Hawaii Republican Party. Furthermore, the Home Rule Party suffered a schism when Prince Jonah Kūhiō Kalanianaʻole left the party's convention on July 10 to temporarily form the Hui Kuokoa Party before joining the Republicans.  In the following elections, the Republicans successfully defeated Wilcox by running Prince Kalanianaʻole, taking control of the legislature with 26 of the 36 seats. Following this defeat, the Home Rule Party would continue to exist in a weakened form until 1912, when it fused with the Hawaii Republican Party.

The Democratic Party of Hawaii was reorganized in 1902, but would not become influential until the 1920s when it won multiple Honolulu mayoral elections and elected William Paul Jarrett as delegate to the House of Representatives. However, the Republican party retook the delegation to the House in the 1930s and 1940s, due to support from the Big Five sugar producers. A seminal moment in Hawaiian history, the power of the Big Five was weakened by the National Labor Relations Act of 1935, which lead to unionization on Hawaii's sugar plantations and ultimately the Democratic Revolution of 1954. In elections that year, the Hawaii Republican Party lost control of the territorial legislature for the first time since 1900, as the Democratic affiliate won nine of the fifteen territorial senate seats and twenty two of the thirty territorial house seats. The Democrats retained control of the legislature in the 1956 elections, while the Republicans retook control of the senate in the 1958 elections.

Statehood

On May 16, 1959, the affiliate held its first state convention where most of the officer positions went uncontested except for national committeewoman and where the candidates for the upcoming federal and state special elections. In the gubernatorial election incumbent Territorial Governor William F. Quinn narrowly won by 4,139 votes; in the Senate special elections Hiram Fong narrowly won by 9,514 votes while Wilfred Tsukiyama was narrowly defeated by 4,577 votes; and Republicans lost the House election in a landslide.

During the 1998 gubernatorial election Maui Mayor Linda Lingle won the Republican nomination and used dissatisfaction with Governor Ben Cayetano's handling of the economy to propel her campaign and was shown to be polling above Cayetano in multiple polls. However, allegations of Lingle being a lesbian and her decision as mayor to require state employees to work on Christmas Eve hurt her. In the general election she was narrowly defeated by 5,254 votes, but she was the most successful Republican nominee for governor since Randolph Crossley in 1966.

In 1999 Lingle and many of her supporters took over leadership positions in the party with Lingle herself defeating James Kuroiwa Jr., who was aligned with the party's conservative wing and was pro-life, to become chairwoman with 325 to 63 votes.

During the 2002 gubernatorial election the Democratic party had a contentious primary where Mazie Hirono defeated Ed Case by 2,000 votes and Hirono's campaign was later hurt by corruption allegations that allowed Linda Lingle to narrowly win the election becoming the first Republican governor since 1962. She later won reelection in 2006 becoming the only multi-term popularly elected Republican governor in the state's history.

During the 2004 presidential election multiple polls showed George W. Bush performing well in Hawaii and with recent gubernatorial victory the party made a push to win at least three seats to prevent Governor Lingle's vetoes from being overruled and possibly eleven seats in the state house to hold a one-seat majority of twenty six seats to the Democratic twenty five seats that would allow. However, the Bush campaign later decreased its efforts in Hawaii and lost five seats in the House despite Bush winning 45.26% of the vote and being the closet the Republicans have come to winning the state in a presidential election since 1984.

In 2010 Representative Neil Abercrombie resigned to focus on his gubernatorial campaign and a special election was held to fill the vacancy. Due to special elections not having primaries all of the candidates would run in a single race resulting in two Democrats splitting the vote allowing Charles Djou to win with a plurality of 39.68% of the vote and became the first Republican representative from Hawaii since Pat Saiki in 1991. However, he was narrowly defeated for reelection in the general election by Colleen Hanabusa.

Following Donald Trump's election as president the affiliate lost multiple members with Charles Djou becoming an independent and state House Minority Leader Beth Fukumoto becoming a Democrat. On December 11, 2019, the party cancelled its presidential preference poll and committed all of its primary delegates to Trump. In January 2021, party chair Shirlene Ostrov and vice-chair Edwin Boyette resigned after Boyette used the party's official Twitter account to post a series of tweets praising the QAnon conspiracy theory and describing its adherents as patriots.

Political positions

Economics
As a whole, Hawaii Republicans advocate for limited government, lower taxes, decentralized control of public schools, and improving the state's business climate. Republicans have been supportive of big business plans and commitments to assist companies in the state in competing against large businesses in other states. They also usually support interstate and international commerce.  For example, former Lieutenant Governor Duke Aiona has been a strong proponent of keeping the National Football League's Pro Bowl in Hawaii, and former Governor Linda Lingle proposed tax reduction incentives to businesses to encourage creation of work opportunities, such as hotel renovations.

Environment

In the Reform Party, a pre-statehood group that after annexation was largely sympathetic toward the Republican Party, Lorrin Thurston was a strong supporter of the formation of Hawaii Volcanoes National Park. In the 21st century, Governor Lingle proposed a Clean Energy Initiative to promote clean and renewable energy resources, with the goal of making the state 70% energy self-sustainable by 2030. The initiative plans to use solar, wind, ocean, geothermal, and biomass as energy resources with a phased reduction in the use of fossil fuels.

Religion
Despite the influence of the early missionaries and despite recent national trends, the Republican party in Hawaii steadily lost its Christian overtone over time. After annexation, Christians proselytized to new, incoming immigrants contracted to work on Hawaii's growing sugar industry. This was, in large part, brought on by Farrington v. Tokushige (1927), a U.S. Supreme Court case brought by approximately 100 Japanese, Korean, and Chinese language schools, a number of which were also Buddhist religious schools, against Republican Governor Wallace R. Farrington and the Republican government for passing laws limiting the material taught in private schools, including Buddhist philosophy. The court found the laws unconstitutional and in violation of parents' Fifth Amendment right to choose the education of their children. Duke Aiona, a Republican, presented a proclamation to the president of the Junior Young Buddhist Association in 2004 and attended the 2010 lantern festival.

Recently, the Party has been hesitant to associate itself with religion in general, with members citing the negative effects of the party's association with the Hawaii branch of the Christian Coalition formed by Pat Robertson in 1988. The Coalition swelled Republican membership by 50%, but also gave rise to infighting; by 1993 the party had lost more legislative seats than it started with.

Staff

County chairs

Elected officials

Congress

Hiram Fong, United States Senator (1959–1977)
Charles Djou, United States Representative from Hawaii's 1st district (2010–2011)
Pat Saiki, United States Representative from Hawaii's 1st district (1987–1991)
Mary Elizabeth Pruett Farrington, Delegate to the United States House from Hawaii Territory's at-large district (1954–1957)
Joseph Rider Farrington, Delegate to the United States House from Hawaii Territory's at-large district (1943–1954)
Samuel Wilder King, Delegate to the United States House from Hawaii Territory's at-large district (1935–1943)
Victor S. K. Houston, Delegate to the United States House from Hawaii Territory's at-large district (1927–1933)
Henry Alexander Baldwin, Delegate to the United States House from Hawaii Territory's at-large district (1922–1923)
Jonah Kūhiō Kalanianaʻole, Delegate to the United States House from Hawaii Territory's at-large district (1903–1922)

State officials

Linda Lingle, Governor of Hawaii (2002–2010)
Duke Aiona, Lieutenant Governor of Hawaii (2002–2010)
William F. Quinn, Governor of Hawaii (1957–1962)
James Kealoha, Lieutenant Governor of Hawaii (1959–1962)
Samuel Wilder King, Territorial Governor of Hawaii (1953–1957)
Lawrence M. Judd, Territorial Governor of Hawaii (1929–1934)
Wallace Rider Farrington, Territorial Governor of Hawaii (1921–1929)
Walter F. Frear, Territorial Governor of Hawaii (1907–1913)
George R. Carter, Territorial Governor of Hawaii (1903–1907)
Sanford B. Dole, Territorial Governor of Hawaii (1900–1903)

State legislative leaders

Senate Minority Leader: Kurt Fevella (de facto)
House Minority Leader: Lauren Matsumoto
House Minority Floor Leader: Diamond Garcia

Electoral performance

Presidential

Gubernatorial

Congressional

State legislature

See also
Aloha ʻĀina Party of Hawai'i
Green Party of Hawaii
Democratic Party of Hawaii

References

Bibliography

External links

Republican Party (United States) by state
Politics of Hawaii
Republican Party
State and local conservative parties in the United States